Matthiola is a genus of flowering plant in the mustard family Brassicaceae. It is named after Italian naturalist Pietro Andrea Mattioli (1501–1577). The genus contains about 50 species of annual, biennial and perennial herbaceous plants and subshrubs.  Many are cultivated for their heavily scented, colorful flowers.

The common name stock may be applied to the whole genus, more specifically to varieties and cultivars of Matthiola incana.  The common names evening stock and night-scented stock are applied to varieties of Matthiola longipetala (syn. M. bicornis). The common name Virginia stock refers to a separate genus of the same family (Malcolmia maritima).

Species
The following species are accepted:

Matthiola afghanica Rech.f. & Köie
Matthiola anchoniifolia Hub.-Mor.
Matthiola arabica Boiss.
Matthiola aspera Boiss.
Matthiola boissieri Grossh.
Matthiola bolleana Webb ex Christ
Matthiola bucharica Czerniak.
Matthiola caspica (N.Busch) Grossh.
Matthiola chenopodiifolia Fisch. & C.A.Mey.
Matthiola chorassanica Bunge ex Boiss.
Matthiola codringtonii Rech.f.
Matthiola crassifolia Boiss. & Gaill.
Matthiola czerniakowskae Botsch. & Vved.
Matthiola daghestanica (Conti) N.Busch
Matthiola damascena Boiss.
Matthiola dumulosa Boiss. & Buhse
Matthiola erlangeriana Engl.
Matthiola farinosa Bunge ex Boiss.
Matthiola flavida Boiss.
Matthiola fragrans (Fisch.) Bunge
Matthiola fruticulosa (L.) Maire – sad stock
Matthiola ghorana Rech.f.
Matthiola glutinosa Jafri
Matthiola graminea Rech.f.
Matthiola incana (L.) W.T.Aiton – stock, hoary stock, gilly-flower
Matthiola integrifolia Kom.
Matthiola kralikii Pomel
Matthiola livida (Delile) DC. – desert stock
Matthiola longipetala (Vent.) DC. – night-scented stock
Matthiola lunata DC.
Matthiola macranica Rech.f.
Matthiola maderensis Lowe
Matthiola maroccana Coss.
Matthiola montana Boiss.
Matthiola obovata Bunge
Matthiola odoratissima (M.Bieb.) W.T.Aiton
Matthiola parviflora (Schousb.) W.T.Aiton
Matthiola perennis Conti
Matthiola perpusilla Rech.f.
Matthiola puntensis Hedge & A.G.Mill.
Matthiola revoluta Bunge ex Boiss.
Matthiola robusta Bunge
Matthiola scapifera Humbert
Matthiola shehbazii Ranjbar & Karami
Matthiola shiraziana Zeraatkar, Khosravi, F.Ghahrem., Al-Shehbaz & Assadi
Matthiola sinuata (L.) W.T.Aiton – sea stock
Matthiola spathulata Conti
Matthiola stoddartii Bunge
Matthiola superba Conti
Matthiola tatarica (Pall.) DC.
Matthiola taurica (Conti) Grossh.
Matthiola tianschanica Sarkisova
Matthiola tomentosa Bél.
Matthiola torulosa (Thunb.) DC.
Matthiola tricuspidata (L.) W.T.Aiton – three-horned stock
Matthiola trojana Dirmenci, Satil & Tümen

Gallery

References

Bibliography

External links
 Matthiola. Flora of Pakistan.
 JSTOR Plant Science entries

 
Brassicaceae genera